Non è vero... ma ci credo ("It isn't is true... but I believe it") is a 1952 Italian comedy film directed by Sergio Grieco.

Plot
A young man in love with a girl whose father does not approve of him, and who is also his employer, disguises himself as a hunchback to get into the father's good graces.

Cast
 Peppino De Filippo
 Titina De Filippo
 Lidia Martora
 Luigi De Filippo
 Guglielmo Inglese
 Pietro Carloni
 Tamara D'Oria
 Liliana Bonfatti 
 Carlo Croccolo
 Jole Farnese
 Nicola Manzari 
 Rosita Pisano

References

External links

1952 films
1950s Italian-language films
Films set in Naples
Films directed by Sergio Grieco
Italian comedy films
1952 comedy films
Italian black-and-white films
1950s Italian films